Love Station may refer to:
 Love Station (2016 film), an Indian film directed by Ashok Pati
 Love Station (2019 film), a Nepalese film directed by Ujwal Ghimire
 Love Station (1993 film), a Kazakh film starring Bayan Yessentayeva
 Lovestation, a British electronic dance music group
 "Love Station", a song by Lim Young-woong from Im Hero, 2022